Scerni may refer to:

 Scerni, a town and municipality of the province of Chieti, Italy
 Fred Scerni (born 1948), American politician 
Gianni Scerni, former chairman of Genoa C.F.C.